Barron Storey (born 1940, Dallas, TX) is an American illustrator, graphic novelist, and educator. He is famous for his accomplishments as an illustrator and fine artist, as well as for his career as a teacher. Storey has taught illustration since the 1970s and currently is on the faculty at San Jose State University. He trained at Art Center in Los Angeles and under Robert Weaver at the School of Visual Arts in New York.

Career

Barron Storey has been a commercial illustrator since the 1960s, and his clients have included major magazines such as Boys' Life, Reader's Digest, and National Geographic. His cover portraits for Time of Howard Hughes and Yitzhak Rabin hang in the Smithsonian's National Portrait Gallery. His giant painting of the South American rain forest hangs in New York's American Museum of Natural History, and a 1979 rendering of the space shuttle commissioned by NASA, the first official painting ever done of it, hangs in the Air and Space Museum on the National Mall.

As a book illustrator he has done cover illustrations for the Franklin Library classics, War and Peace, The Good Earth and Stories by Sinclair Lewis; as well as the covers of Fahrenheit 451 for Del Rey / Ballantine; and, most famously, the 1980 reissue of Lord of the Flies.

Storey has also published many comics and graphic novels, including The Marat/Sade Journals (Tundra), which was nominated for an Eisner Award, Neil Gaiman's The Sandman: Endless Nights (DC/Vertigo) which won an Eisner, Tales from the Edge #1-10, Barron Storey’s WATCH Magazine (Vanguard), and Life After Black (Graphic Novel Art). Several of his students, including Scott McCloud, Peter Kuper, and Dan Brereton, have become leading figures in the graphic novel field.

In Summer/Fall of 2015, Storey was forced into retirement by California College of the Arts, the Oakland CA institution where he had been teaching illustration for 30 years.

Awards

New York Society of Illustrators' Gold Medal in 1976 for his portrait of Lotte Lenya.
New York Society of Illustrators' Distinguished Educator award of the New York Society of Illustrators, 2001.
Eisner award for The Sandman: Endless Nights.

Exhibits

os-cil-la-tor: Forty Years of Music Journals, Bert Green Fine Art, Chicago, IL, 2016.
Factum 1 and Factum 2, Bert Green Fine Art, Chicago IL, 2013.
Smithsonian National Portrait Gallery, Permanent Collection, Washington, D.C. 
RE: SEX, Solo Exhibition, Bert Green Fine Art, Los Angeles, CA, 2011. 
Tarot: An Artists’ Vision of the Future, Group Exhibition, Galerie Petit Papiers, Bruxelles, Belgium, 2010. 
RE: Bob, Solo Exhibition, Anno Domini, San Jose, CA, 2010. 
Belle Foundation for Cultural Development, Grant, 2009. 
Cardboard Town, Solo Exhibition, Bert Green Fine Art, Los Angeles, CA, 2009. 
Life After Black: The Visual Journals of Barron Storey, Solo Exhibition, The American Museum of *Illustration/Society of Illustrators, New York, NY, 2009. 
Victims, Solo Exhibition, Anno Domini, San Jose, CA, 2007. 
Osseus Labyrint Retrospective, Solo Exhibition, Bert Green Fine Art, Los Angeles, CA, 2006. 
Black Iraq, Solo Exhibition, Anno Domini, San Jose, CA, 2003. 
More B.S. Than You Can Throw A Stick At, Solo Exhibition, Anno Domini, San Jose, CA, 2001. 
Screever, Solo Exhibition, Fifty 24SF, San Francisco, CA, 2001. 
Society of Illustrators, Distinguished Educator in the Arts, 2001 Honoree. 
Unfunny Comics, Solo Exhibition, Fobbo Gallery, San Francisco, CA, 1991.
Grains of Sand: 25 Years of the Sandman, Cartoon Art Museum, San Francisco, CA, 2013-14.

Praise from the art community 

Neil Gaiman, Neil Gaiman Journal, “Lots of people have learned from Barron Storey: Bill Sienkiewicz, and Dave McKean, and Kent Williams and many others, and they're all very proud to admit it. He's a true original, and there aren't many of those around.”

David Choe wrote of Barron in his book, Slow Jams'' (1999): “Nobody draws better than Barron. Not you, not your little sister, your architect dad, not your rebellious ex-boyfriend who draws with his own blood, not the most talented kid at your art school. Not your favorite artist in the whole world; I've seen the work with my own eyes. Nobody draws better than The Barron.”

See also

Eisner Award
Endless Nights

References
https://web.archive.org/web/20091028014708/http://geocities.com/negsleep/main/links/barron/barron.html
https://web.archive.org/web/20131026100144/http://www.cca.edu/academics/faculty/bstorey
http://www.societyillustrators.org/Awards-and-Competitions/Distinguished-Educator/Overview.aspx
https://web.archive.org/web/20070708212432/http://www.graphicnovelart.com/Page.asp?DocID=19248&langue=FR
http://www.sfweekly.com/1996-01-17/news/barron-storey-s-life-is-an-open-comic-book/6/
http://www.neilgaiman.com/journal/2003/10/mark-twain-pseudo-dennis-thatcher.asp
http://www.isfdb.org/cgi-bin/title.cgi?701121
http://www.eidolonfinearts.com/exhibitions_lists/barron_storey_exhbitions
http://www.isfdb.org/cgi-bin/title.cgi?701121

External links
 
 Barron Storey, Blogspot
 Bert Green Fine Art gallery

Living people
American illustrators
Artists from California
1940 births